Minié or Minie may refer to:

 Claude-Étienne Minié (1804-1879), French Army officer and weapons designer
 Minié rifle, designed by Claude-Étienne Minié
 Minié ball, a rifle bullet designed by Claude-Étienne Minié
 Minie Brinkhoff (born 1952), retired Dutch cyclist

See also
 Mini (disambiguation)
 Minni (disambiguation)
 Minnie (disambiguation)